Ghana Empire

Ghana was represented at the 2010 Commonwealth Games held in Delhi, India, from 3 to 14 October 2010. It sent 64 sportsmen and women.

Medals

Medalist

See also
 2010 Commonwealth Games

Nations at the 2010 Commonwealth Games
Ghana at the Commonwealth Games
2010 in Ghanaian sport